The 1989/90 FIS Freestyle Skiing World Cup was the eleventh World Cup season in freestyle skiing organised by International Ski Federation. The season started on 8 December 1989 and ended on 16 March 1990. This season included four disciplines: aerials, moguls, ballet and combined.

Men

Moguls

Ballet

Aerials

Combined

Ladies

Moguls

Ballet

Aerials

Combined

Men's standings

Overall 

Standings after 36 races.

Moguls 

Standings after 9 races.

Aerials 

Standings after 9 races.

Ballet 

Standings after 9 races.

Combined 

Standings after 9 races.

Ladies' standings

Overall 

Standings after 36 races.

Moguls 

Standings after 9 races.

Aerials 

Standings after 9 races.

Ballet 

Standings after 9 races.

Combined 

Standings after 9 races.

References

FIS Freestyle Skiing World Cup
World Cup
World Cup